Galeropsis is a genus of fungi in the Bolbitiaceae family of mushrooms. The genus is widespread in dry, arid habitats, and contains 16 species. Galeropsis was circumscribed by the Czech botanist Josef Velenovský in 1930.

Species
Galeropsis allospora
Galeropsis andina
Galeropsis angusticeps
Galeropsis aporos
Galeropsis besseyi
Galeropsis bispora
Galeropsis deceptiva
Galeropsis desertorum
Galeropsis liberata
Galeropsis madagascariensis
Galeropsis mitriformis
Galeropsis paradoxa
Galeropsis plantaginiformis
Galeropsis polytrichoides

References

External links

Bolbitiaceae
Agaricales genera